Xiaomi Mi 11 Ultra is an Android high-end smartphone developed by Xiaomi, released in April of 2021.It serves as the successor to the Xiaomi Mi 10 Ultra. Unlike its China-only predecessor, the Mi 11 Ultra is available for retail in the global market. 

The Mi 11 Ultra is heavily marketed around its camera capabilities. At the time of release, the Mi 11 Ultra featured the largest main camera sensor of any conventional smartphone, at 1/1.12 inch. Paired with the main camera are two auxiliary cameras, a 13mm equivalent ultra-wide angle camera and a 120mm equivalent periscope telephoto camera capable of 5x optical zoom. The Mi 11 Ultra features a 1.1-inch secondary display at the back of the phone, next to its camera module.

The Mi 11 Ultra employs a 6.81-inch WQHD+ curved OLED display with a 120hz refresh rate, capable of a touch sampling rate of 480hz and a peak brightness of 1700 nits. The Mi 11 Ultra is powered by a Snapdragon 888 chipset, the flagship Android processor at the time of release. The Mi 11 Ultra utilises a 5000 mAh battery, capable of 67W wired, 67W wireless, and 10W reverse charging.  Upon release, the Mi 11 Ultra had a starting price of £1,199 in the UK, on par with the competition.

References

External links 

 

Android (operating system) devices
Phablets
Mobile phones with multiple rear cameras
Mobile phones with 8K video recording
Xiaomi smartphones
Mobile phones with infrared transmitter
Mobile phones introduced in 2021